B. Ruby Rich is an American scholar; critic of independent, Latin American, documentary, feminist, and queer films; and a professor emerita of Film & Digital Media and Social Documentation at UC Santa Cruz. Among her many contributions, she is known for coining the term "New Queer Cinema". She is currently the editor of Film Quarterly, a scholarly film journal published by University of California Press.

Career 
Rich began her career in film exhibition as co-founder of the Woods Hole Film Society. In 1973, she became associate director of what is now the Gene Siskel Film Center at the Art Institute of Chicago. After working as film critic for the Chicago Reader, she moved to New York City to become the director of the film program for the New York State Council on the Arts, where she worked for a decade. While living in New York City, she began writing for the Village Voice. She then moved to San Francisco, where she began teaching, first at the University of California, Berkeley, and then at UC Santa Cruz. As Professor of Film and Digital Media there, she helped to build the Social Documentation graduate program.

In 2013, Rich accepted the position of Editor in Chief at Film Quarterly. She re-organized its editorial board and re-launched its website with several new features, including the "Quorum" column and video recordings of FQ webinars.

In 2017, the Barbican hosted a season of films and talks to commemorate her career as a film critic, academic and curator.

Rich is now Professor Emerita, UC Santa Cruz, and lives in San Francisco and Paris. She continues to appear in documentaries for independent filmmakers and television, as well as on selected Criterion  releases.

Media appearances 
In 1999, Rich appeared as a guest critic on several episodes of Roger Ebert at the Movies.

B. Ruby Rich appears in the 2009 documentary film For the Love of Movies: The Story of American Film Criticism where she discusses the appeal of the film Amélie, and expresses her desire for a new kind of criticism to emerge from young critics who can go beyond auteur theory.

She appears in the film !Women Art Revolution.

New Queer Cinema and other influences 
Rich coined the term "New Queer Cinema" in a 1992 article for the Village Voice, which was reprinted in Sight and Sound. In the article, Rich identified a wave of films that "collided" at film festivals such as Sundance and TIFF. Rich asserted that these independent films, made by and for queer-identified people, used radical aesthetics to combat homophobia, grapple with the trauma of the AIDS epidemic, and address complicated queer subjectivities while importing much needed discussions of race. Rich argued that, although films dealing with these issues can be found in the previous decade, New Queer Cinema broke with the gay liberation ethos that self-representation should remain positive and desirable.

Rich's presence at film festivals (such as Sundance, where she was an early member of the selection committee; TIFF, where she served as an international programmer in 2002; Telluride, where she was Guest Director in 1996; and Provincetown, where she appears every spring) has been significant. Her film reviews in major national publications, and her commentary on public broadcasting programs such as The World, Independent View, and All Things Considered, have led to her being characterized as a "central figure" in cinema studies and culture.

Publications

Chick Flicks: Theories and Memories of the Feminist Film Movement 
The back cover of her 1998 book, Chick Flicks: Theories and Memories of the Feminist Film Movement, reads: "If there was a moment during the sixties, seventies, or eighties that changed the history of the women's film movement, B. Ruby Rich was there. Part journalistic chronicle, part memoir, and 100 percent pure cultural historical odyssey, Chick Flicks – with its definitive, the way-it-was collective essays – captures the birth and growth of feminist film as no other book has done." Her book includes critical analyses of Sally Potter's Thriller, the films of Yvonne Rainer, and Leontine Sagan's Mädchen in Uniform.

New Queer Cinema: The Director's Cut 
Mostly an assemblage of Rich's published writing on queer films of the preceding decades, New Queer Cinema: The Director's Cut moves from the moment of New Queer Cinema's inception in the early 1990s festival circuit to its Hollywood co-option in the late 1990s to its more recent international impact and European and U.S. mainstreaming. The book includes studies of the films The Watermelon Woman, Go Fish, Milk, as well as the films of Lucrecia Martel and Gregg Araki.

Contributions
Rich was a regular contributor to The Village Voice , the San Francisco Bay Guardian and the British Film Institute's Sight & Sound. She has also contributed to The Guardian, The Nation, Elle, Mirabella, The Advocate and Out. She was the founding editor of film/video reviews for GLQ: A Journal of Lesbian and Gay Studies. Since 2013, she has been the Editor in Chief of the journal, Film Quarterly.

Awards 
Rich received the 2006 Lifetime Achievement Award from the Society for Cinema and Media Studies and the 2007 Brudner Memorial Prize at Yale University. In 2012, she was awarded the Frameline Award – the first critic to receive this honor since Vito Russo was given the first. In 2014, the Guadalajara Film Festival presented her with its "Queer Icon" Maguey Award.

References

Further reading

External links

UC Santa Cruz Currents online - Film critic B. Ruby Rich

Editorials for Film Quarterly

American film critics
Writers from Boston
Living people
Yale University alumni
American editors
University of California, Santa Cruz faculty
Year of birth missing (living people)